Svetlana Pauliukaitė (born 31 July 1985 in Mosėdis) is a Lithuanian professional track and road cyclist. National road and track championships winner. In 2008 Pauliukaitė represented Lithuania at 2008 Summer Olympics in track cycling events. She won 12 national championships medals. She also represented Lithuania in three world championships in 2008, 2009 and 2010.
She married with Matthias Draeger and has two children.

Career highlights

2005
1st 20 km road race, National Championships, Ignalina

2006
1st Point races, National Championships

2009
5th Team pursuit, World championships, Pruszków

References 
Lithuanian Sport Encyclopedia

1982 births
Living people
Lithuanian female cyclists
Lithuanian track cyclists
Road racing cyclists
Cyclists at the 2008 Summer Olympics
Olympic cyclists of Lithuania
People from Skuodas District Municipality